Thais nodosa is a species of sea snail, a marine gastropod mollusk in the family Muricidae, the murex snails or rock snails.

Description

The length of the shell attains .

Distribution
Inhabits rocky shores of Brazil and western Africa, (Cape Verde).

References

Thais (gastropod)
Gastropods described in 1758
Taxa named by Carl Linnaeus